Keogan is an anglicized form of the Irish surname Ó Ceogáin. Notable people with the surname include:

Christopher Keogan (born 1992), English snooker player
Donal Keogan (born 1991), Irish Gaelic footballer
George Keogan (1890–1943), American football, basketball and baseball coach
Murray Keogan (born 1950), Canadian ice hockey
Sharon Keogan, Irish politician

See also 

 Keegan

English-language surnames
Anglicised Irish-language surnames
Surnames of Irish origin
Surnames of British Isles origin